The Best of Candlebox is a greatest hits album by the Seattle rock band Candlebox, released on May 23, 2006. The album contains songs from the band's first three albums, as well as the song "Glowing Soul," from the soundtrack to The Waterboy.

Candlebox was contacted upon the decision by WEA to release a best-of compilation. This prompted their reuniting after a seven-year hiatus and a tour in support of the compilation. Shortly after, Candlebox recorded their first studio album in ten years, Into the Sun.

Track listing 
 "You"  – 4:57 from Candlebox
 "Blossom"  – 4:31 from Candlebox
 "Understanding"  – 4:47 from Lucy
 "Simple Lessons"  – 2:53 from Lucy
 "Best Friend"  – 3:27 from Lucy
 "Arrow"  – 3:13 from Candlebox
 "Happy Pills"  – 3:26 from Happy Pills
 "Far Behind"  – 4:59 from Candlebox
 "Change"  – 6:24 from Candlebox
 "Lucy"  – 4:45 from Lucy
 "Cover Me"  – 4:45 from Candlebox
 "It's Alright"  – 5:24 from Happy Pills
 "Sometimes"  – 5:09 from Happy Pills
 "10,000 Horses"  – 5:10 from Happy Pills
 "Glowing Soul"  – 4:19 from The Waterboy soundtrack

References 

Candlebox albums
2006 greatest hits albums